Lynn Thomsen (born September 12, 1964) is a former American football player.  He was elected to the College Football Hall of Fame in 1997.

References

1964 births
Living people
College Football Hall of Fame inductees
American football defensive tackles